Columbella nomanensis is a species of sea snail, a marine gastropod mollusk in the family Columbellidae, the dove snails.

This is a nomen dubium, a name that is of unknown or doubtful application.

Description

Distribution

References

Columbellidae